Collectanea Mathematica (Collect. Math.) is a  mathematical journal of the Institute of Mathematics of the University of Barcelona (IMUB), published by Springer since 2011, with a periodicity of three issues per year. It publishes original research papers in all fields of pure and applied mathematics.

History 
During the period 1987-2007, with Joan Cerdà as the Main Editor, the journal took several steps forward to further improve its scientific quality. In 2003, the recently created Institute of Mathematics of the University of Barcelona started to be in charge of its publication, providing Collectanea Mathematica with a stable economic and scientific support. As a consequence, coverage of Collectanea Mathematica by the Journal Citation Reports (JCR)   began with the 2005 volume and 2007 was its first  impact factor  in JCR. In 2008  Rosa Maria Miró Roig became  editor-in-chief. In this period the journal has changed its editorial policy and Springer is the new publisher since 2011. Since 2021 the current editor-in-chief is Carlos D'Andrea.

Abstracting and indexing 
Collectanea Mathematica is indexed in databases such as Current Contents (Physical Chemical and Earth Sciences) and ISI Web of Science, MathSciNet, Zentralblatt MATH, and Scopus.

References

External links 
 
 European Digital Mathematics Library (EuDML)
 Revistes Catalanes amb Accés Obert (RACO)
 Biblioteca Digital de Matemáticas (DML-E)

Publications established in 1948
Mathematics journals
English-language journals
Triannual journals